Reardan-Edwall School District is a school district in Washington, headquartered in Reardan. It serves Reardan and Edwall.

Its schools are Reardan Elementary School and Reardan Middle/High School.

Notable alumni
 Sherman Alexie - Reardan High School

References

External links

 Reardan-Edwall School District

School districts in Washington (state)
Education in Lincoln County, Washington